James Greene (19 May 1931 – 5 January 2021) was a Northern Irish actor who appeared in numerous plays and series on British television over a period of 40 years. He often played lawyers, clergymen, army officers and latterly judges.

Greene was a continuity announcer on Ulster Television from 1959 until 1965. He died in January 2021 at the age of 89.

Filmography

Colditz (1972, TV) as Adjutant
Thriller (1974, TV) as Policeman/Constable Breck
Secret Army (TV series) (1978, TV) Episode The Hostage as Brigadier General Markham
Tales of the Unexpected (1980, TV) as Garage Attendant
Chocky (1984, TV) as Mr. Trimble
My Brother Jonathan (1985, TV) as Mr. Wheeler
Mapp & Lucia (1985-1986, TV) as Reverend Bartlett
Empire of the Sun (1987) as British Prisoner
Howards' Way (1988, TV) as Dr. O'Rourke
The Bill (1990-2008, TV) as Various Roles
Let Them Eat Cake (1999, TV) as The Comte de Vache
The Prince and the Pauper (2000) as Archbishop Cranmer 
From Hell (2001) as Masonic Governor
Band of Brothers (2001, TV) as Old Man on Bicycle
The Sin Eater (2003) as Percy
Johnny English (2003) as Scottish Bishop
The Order (2003) as British Doctor
William and Mary (2003-2005, TV) as Arnold McKinnon
Doctors (2004-2018, TV) as Peter/Leonard Morden
Breakfast on Pluto (2005) as Gentleman
Brothers of the Head (2005) as Brian Aldiss
Holby City (2005-2013, TV) as Various Roles
Spooks (2006, TV) as Charlie Holland
Dracula (2006, TV) as Dr. Blore
Quest for a Heart (2007) as Narrator (English version, voice)
RocknRolla (2008) as Judge
Sherlock Holmes (2009) as Governor
Midsomer Murders (2010, TV) as Douglas Wakely
Albert Nobbs (2011) as Patrick
Borgia (2011, TV) as  Maffeo Gherardo
Dimensions (2011) as Old Man
Whole Lotta Sole (2011) as Granda Sox
Merlin (2011, TV) as Ferryman
Les Misérables (2012) as Ensemble 'Master of the House'
Shetland (2012, TV) as Andrew Haldane
Doctor Who (2013, TV) as The Abbott
The Christmas Candle (2013) as Old Man
Big School (2013-2014, TV) as Head of Science/Mr. John Hubble
Birds of a Feather (2014, TV) as Stanley Barrington Court the Third
Wolf Hall (2015, TV) as Latin-Speaking Priest
Downton Abbey (2015, TV) as Sir Mark Stiles
The Crown (2017, TV) as Royal Horological Conservator

References

External links
 

1931 births
2021 deaths
20th-century male actors from Northern Ireland
21st-century male actors from Northern Ireland
Male actors from Belfast
Male television actors from Northern Ireland